Sir Godfrey Rolles Driver  (20 August 1892 – 22 April 1975), known as G. R. Driver, was an English Orientalist noted for his studies of Semitic languages and Assyriology. He is considered the "most distinguished British Hebraist of the late nineteenth and early twentieth centuries".

Life 

Driver was born in Oxford, England, son of the noted English biblical scholar Samuel Rolles Driver, and educated at Winchester College and New College, Oxford, (1911–1915) where he won the Pusey and Ellerton and Senior Kennicott Hebrew Scholarships and the Gaisford Prize for Greek prose (1913) and for Greek verse (1916).

After serving in World War I, with tasks as varied as hospital work, postal censorship, and intelligence, in 1919, he was named fellow and classical tutor in Magdalen College, Oxford. He remained at Oxford for his entire career, ultimately as Professor of Semitic Philology, and produced a steady stream of scholarly articles on subjects including vocabulary of the Old Testament, and words and texts in the Akkadian, Arabic, Aramaic, Hebrew, and Syriac languages.

From 1937 to 1938 Driver was the president of the Society for Old Testament Study, unusually for a two-year period. In 1959, he was the president of the third congress of The International Organization for the Study of the Old Testament.

He directed the translation of the Old Testament for the New English Bible from its inception in 1949, completed and first published in 1970.
He  was knighted in 1968.

Selected works 
 Letters of the first Babylonian dynasty, OECT III, 1925.
 Studies in Cappadocian Tablets, Paris, 1927.
 Semitic Writing: From Pictograph to Alphabet, 1948 (Schweich Lectures for 1944).
 The Babylonian Laws, with J. C. Miles, Oxford, 1952–1955.
 Aramaic Documents of the Fifth Century B.C., Oxford, 1954 (Abridged and Revised edition 1957).
 Canaanite Myths and Legends, Edinburgh: T. & T. Clark, 1956.
 The Judaean scrolls: The problem and a solution, Oxford: Blackwell, 1965.

References

Sources 
 
 CDLI Wiki.
 F.F. Bruce, Godfrey Rolles Driver (1892–1975), The Witness, 105, No. 1255, pp. 266–267 (July 1975).
 

1892 births
1975 deaths
People from Oxford
People educated at Winchester College
Alumni of New College, Oxford
English orientalists
English Assyriologists
Christian Hebraists
Fellows of Magdalen College, Oxford
Fellows of the British Academy
Commanders of the Order of the British Empire
Knights Bachelor
Recipients of the Military Cross
Presidents of the Society for Old Testament Study